Olathe USD 233, also known as Olathe Public Schools, is a public unified school district headquartered in Olathe, Kansas, United States.  It is one of the major school districts in the Kansas City Metropolitan Area and is one of the larger school districts in the state of Kansas.  There are currently 30,145 students enrolled in the district, which  operates 5 high schools, 10 middle schools, and 35 elementary schools (one planned to open in 2019), as well as a number of additional educational and support facilities.

Portions of the city of Olathe make up 66% of the district's territory. Areas of Lenexa make up 19%, sections of Overland Park make up 8%, and portions of Shawnee make up less than 1%. Unincorporated areas make up about 6% of the territory.

History
The district was created in 1965 from the consolidation of the Countryside School District 103 (a large portion), Meadowlane School District 108, Mount Zion School District 105, Olathe School District 16, and Pleasant View School District 96.  Wayne Fick became the first superintendent of the newly unified district.  At the time of its creation, there were 3687 students attending a single high school, junior high school, and 5 elementary schools.

M.L. Winters was named superintendent in 1968, and served in that role for 23 years until 1991 - the longest tenure of any superintendent in Olathe history.  During that time, district enrollment increased from 4433 to 15,357 students, and 22 new facilities were constructed or rebuilt.  The district continued to grow at a rapid pace under the leadership of superintendents Ron Wimmer (1991-2005) and Patricia All (2005-2010, 2016-17), Marlin Berry (2010-2016), and John Allison (2017- ).  In 2010, the district recorded an official enrollment of 27,999, becoming the second largest school district in Kansas.

Beginning in 2009, the district launched a new K-5, 6-8, 9-12 grade configuration.  Prior to this time, students in grades 10-12 were assigned to high schools, grades 7-9 to junior high schools, and grades K-6 in elementary schools.  As part of this transition, all junior highs were rebranded as middle schools.  The transition to this new configuration was completed in 2011. In August 2014, it was announced that construction would begin on Olathe's fifth high school, Olathe West High School and in 2018, the 36th elementary school was announced, named Canyon Creek Elementary School. 

The iconic "Blue Backpack Kid" student resource website was first introduced in 2004, and remained largely unchanged until the 2012 redesign which features a gray and beige color scheme with a slideshow that features various students and events.

Demographics
, there were 29,622 students enrolled in the school district, which is operated by 4,442 staff/faculty. The vast majority (83.2%) of students are drawn from Olathe, Kansas with the remainder of students living in the neighboring cities of Overland Park (10.1%), Lenexa (5.9%),  Shawnee (0.1%), unincorporated areas of Johnson County, Kansas (0.3%), or outside the district (0.4%).  The general population of the district boundaries is 158,000, with a median age of 33.2 years old.

The district has a high school graduation rate of 92.9%, with average class sizes as follows:
 Elementary Schools: 20.5
 Middle Schools: 22.0
 High Schools: 25.5

Racially/ethnically, the student body is predominantly (69.1%) White/Caucasian. The largest minority groups are Hispanic/Latino (15.0%), Black/African American (7.0%), and Asian (4.3%).

Leadership
In 2017, John Allison was appointed as district superintendent.

The Olathe Board of Education is composed of seven members.

Facilities

See also 
 Kansas State Department of Education
 Kansas State High School Activities Association
 List of high schools in Kansas
 List of unified school districts in Kansas

References

External links
 

School districts in Kansas
Education in Olathe, Kansas
Education in Johnson County, Kansas
1965 establishments in Kansas
School districts established in 1965